The Dittaino (Latin: Chrysas) is a river of central Sicily which rises in the Heraean Mountains, not far from the modern towns of Gangi and Enna.

Hydronym 
The modern name is the Sicilian version of Arab vocable Wādī al-tīn, namely "The River of Sandstone".

References

Rivers of Italy
Rivers of Sicily
Rivers of the Province of Enna
Rivers of the Province of Catania